Panos Aravantinos Decor Museum is a museum in Piraeus, Athens, Greece. Museum named after Panos Aravantinos, famous Greek and German opera scenic  and costume designer and decorator. The museum is in the building of Municipal theater of Piraeus and there are about 1300 works of Panos Aravantinos

References

Museums in Piraeus